Battalovo (Battal) is a rural locality (a village) in Mindyaksky Selsoviet, Uchalinsky District, Bashkortostan, Russia. The population was 316 as of 2010. There are 6 streets.

Geography 
Battalovo is located 83 km southwest of Uchaly (the district's administrative centre) by road. Ozyorny and Uzungulovo are the nearest rural localities.

References 

Rural localities in Uchalinsky District